The Silliman Hall is  a building constructed in the Stick Style of American architecture in Dumaguete, Negros Oriental,  Philippines. It was built in the early 1900s. It was converted to a museum in 1970. It is located in Dumaguete, Negros Oriental, Philippines.

Exhibits
The collections are divided into two categories and seven galleries.
It includes artifacts from the indigenous Negritos and the Islamic period and as early as 200 BC.

See also
Balay Negrense
The Ruins (mansion)
Hacienda Rosalia
Dizon-Ramos Museum
Museo Negrense de La Salle
Dr. Jose Corteza Locsin Ancestral house

References 

https://su.edu.ph/page/42-anthropology-museum
http://www.lakadpilipinas.com/2013/07/silliman-museum-dumaguete.html
https://www.lonelyplanet.com/philippines/dumaguete/attractions/silliman-university-anthropology-museum/a/poi-sig/1191596/357338

External links 
 https://su.edu.ph/page/42-anthropology-museum
 http://www.lakadpilipinas.com/2013/07/silliman-museum-dumaguete.html
 https://www.lonelyplanet.com/philippines/dumaguete/attractions/silliman-university-anthropology-museum/a/poi-sig/1191596/357338

Buildings and structures in Dumaguete
Museums in the Philippines
Educational structures in the Philippines
Tourist attractions in Negros Oriental
Silliman University